"She Wants to Be Wanted Again" is a song written by Billy Henderson and Steven Dale Jones. It was first recorded in 1992 by Lee Greenwood for his album Love's on the Way, then by Larry Stewart for his 1994 album Heart Like a Hurricane, and Western Flyer on their 1996 album Back in America.

It was later released as a single by American country music artist Ty Herndon.  It was released in November 1996 as the second single from the album Living in a Moment.  The song reached number 21 on the Billboard Hot Country Singles & Tracks chart.

Chart performance

References

1997 singles
Ty Herndon songs
Larry Stewart (singer) songs
Lee Greenwood songs
Epic Records singles
Songs written by Steven Dale Jones
Song recordings produced by Doug Johnson (record producer)
1992 songs
Western Flyer songs